Anna of Sagan (Polish: Anna żagańska, Czech: Anna Zaháňská, also Hlohovsko-Zaháňská or Zaháňsko-Hlohovská) (born c. 1480, died 27 or 28 October 1541) was the last surviving member of the Głogów-Żagań branch of the Silesian Piasts family, and by marriage duchess of Münsterberg and Oels.

She was the daughter of Prince Jan II the Mad. On 7 January 1488 she married Duke Charles I of Münsterberg-Oels, with whom she had twelve children:
 Henry (* / † 1497)
 Anna (1499–1504)
 Catherine (1500–1507)
 Margareta (1501–1551), married to Jan Zajíc of Hasenburg
 Joachim (1503–1562), Bishop of Brandenburg
 Kunhuta (1504–1532), married to Christopher Cernohorsky of Boskowitz
 Ursula Vorsila (1505–1539), married to Jerome of Bieberstein
 Henry II (1507–1548), Duke of Münsterberg-Oels
 Hedwig (1508–1531), married in 1525 George of Brandenburg-Ansbach
 John (1509–1565), Duke of Münsterberg-Oels
 Barbara (1511–1539), Abbess in Strzelin near Oleśnica
 George II (1512–1553), married to Elizabeth Kostka of Postupitz

She died on 27 or 28 October 1541 and was buried alongside her husband in the parish church of St. Anna in Frankenstein.

Footnotes

References 
 

Medieval Bohemian nobility
Piast dynasty

Podiebrad family
1480 births
1541 deaths

Year of birth uncertain
16th-century Bohemian people
16th-century Bohemian women